Olmeca Region is one of the regions of Veracruz, Mexico.

References 

Regions of Veracruz